Pori Jazz is a large international jazz festival, held annually during the month of July in the coastal city of Pori (a population of 82,809 in January 2010), Finland. It is one of the oldest and best known jazz festivals in Europe, having been arranged every year since 1966.

History
The first, 2-day-long Pori Jazz Festival was held at the Kirjurinluoto island in July 1966 with 1500 visitors. Audiences grew from year to year and the duration of the festival was also increased. Between 1975 and 1984 it became established as a four-day event. Since 1985 the festival has lasted nine days with audiences numbering from 50,000 to 60,000. In the early 1990s the numbers reached 100,000 visitors and in 21st century about 120,000–160,000 people are visiting the festival every summer. In 2014 Pori Jazz had its 49th edition and is already planning its 50th anniversary in 2015. At the moment Pori Jazz Festival is the biggest, best known and most popular summer event in Finland.

The first festival was based on acoustic jazz but little by little electric jazz and other rhythm music, blues, soul, funk, hip-hop and the rich Cuban and Brazilian music took foot. Now Pori Jazz offers a broad contingent of the world's leading artists ranging from long-established figures to up-and-coming stars. About 70 per cent of the program is admission free.

Pori Jazz has managed to keep in the lead among Finnish and international festivals for already over 45 years. The festival atmosphere in particular, created by the music, people, fine services and unique milieu, is second to none and highly appreciated among the visitors. The festival has become an experience the visitors want to repeat every summer. There are over 100 concerts in 11 different venues during 9 festival days. A special Pori Jazz Kids Festival is also arranged for children.

The 49th edition of Pori Jazz Festival was held from 12 to 20 July 2014.

The main venue, Kirjurinluoto Arena, is the only open-air concert park in Finland that is built only for concerts and other happenings. As well as the main venue, which requires a festival ticket to enter, there is a "Jazz street" in the centre of Pori, along the shore of the Kokemäenjoki river, holding smaller music events and clubs as well as street food restaurants and bars. The outdoor music events on the "Jazz street" are free of charge, but events held in clubs might require an entrance fee.

Numerous world-famous musicians (including, for example, Tori Amos, Kylie Minogue, Art Blakey, James Brown, Phil Collins, Chick Corea, Miles Davis, Alicia Keys, Paul Simon, Jamiroquai, Macy Gray, Mary J. Blige, Erykah Badu, Paul Anka, Kanye West, Sting and others) have performed at the festival through the years, as well as lesser-known groups from Finland and elsewhere. Musical genres covered at Pori Jazz include varieties of jazz, blues, soul, funk, hip hop, Afro-Cuban, world music, and occasionally even some forms of pop music.

Pori Jazz performers (partial list) 

 Alicia Keys
 B. B. King
 Benny Goodman
 Björk
 Blood, Sweat & Tears featuring David Clayton Thomas
 Bo Diddley
 Bob Dylan
 Bobby McFerrin
 Bomfunk MC's
 Boz Scaggs
 Buena Vista Social Club
 Cab Calloway
 Chaka Khan
 Chick Corea
 Christina Aguilera
 Chuck Berry
 David Byrne
 De La Soul
 Dizzy Gillespie
 Don Johnson Big Band
 Duffy
 Earth, Wind & Fire
 Elton John
 Elvis Costello
 Erykah Badu
 Fats Domino
 Gary Moore
 George Clinton
 Gloria Gaynor
 Herbie Hancock
 Hurts
 Ina Forsman
 Isaac Hayes
 James Brown
 Jamiroquai
 Jethro Tull
 Joe Cocker
 Joe Satriani
 Jorma Kaukonen
 Kanye West
 Kool & The Gang
 Kylie Minogue
 Lauryn Hill
 Little Richard
 Massive Attack
 Manhattan Transfer
 Mary J. Blige
 Miles Davis
 Muddy Waters
 N.E.R.D
 Oscar Peterson
 Paleface
 Paul Anka
 Paul Simon
 Pet Shop Boys
 Phil Collins
 Ray Charles
 Ringo Starr
 The Roots
 Santana
 Seun Kuti
 Shaggy
 Shakti
 Sly & The Family Stone
 Stevie Ray Vaughan
 Stevie Wonder
 Sting
 Ted Curson
 Tito Puente
 Tom Jones
 Tori Amos
 Toto
 UB40
 Van Morrison
 Youssou N'Dour
 Ziggy Marley

See also
List of jazz festivals

References

External links
 
 

Jazz festivals in Finland
Pori
1966 establishments in Finland
Tourist attractions in Satakunta
Music festivals established in 1966
Summer events in Finland
Music festivals staged internationally